Megan Danso (born 26 April 1990) is a Canadian actress.

Life and work 
Megan Danso was born in Victoria, British Columbia.

Danso first appeared in an episode of the television series Painkiller Jane in 2007, and thenafter in Canadian television series and television films, among them The Troop (2009), Supernatural (2013) and Almost Human in 2014. She also played supporting roles in Jennifer's Body in 2009 and Fifty Shades of Grey in 2015. Her probably best known role is the recurring character Denny (Deni) in the third and fourth seasons of the US-Canadian SciFi series Falling Skies.

Filmography

References

External links 
 

1990 births
Living people
21st-century Canadian actresses
Actresses from Victoria, British Columbia
Canadian film actresses
Canadian television actresses